The Warner Archive Collection is a home video division for releasing classic and cult films from Warner Bros.' library.  It started as a  manufactured-on-demand (MOD) DVD series by Warner Bros. Home Entertainment on March 23, 2009, with the intention of putting previously unreleased catalog films on DVD for the first time. In November 2012, Warner expanded the Archive Collection to include Blu-ray releases, Some Warner Archive releases, such as Wise Guys, previously had a pressed DVD release but have lapsed out of print and have since been re-released as part of the Warner Archive collection.

DVD-R recordable media are manufactured on-demand for the consumer and authorized distributors for online resale, rather than the traditional business model of pressing large batches of discs that ship to "brick and mortar" retailers. This saves on the costs of storing unsold stock in a warehouse and mitigates the risk of a retailer holding unsold merchandise, especially since the majority of the films in the archive do not have widespread public demand. These discs are indistinguishable in quality compared to their mass produced counterparts.

In addition, Warner Archive also sells films and television shows as downloadable Windows Media files, and formerly operated a subscription-based streaming video service, Warner Archive Instant, which allowed members to stream many of the Warner Archive properties in a format similar to Netflix. In 2018, Warner Archive Instant merged with its sister service FilmStruck. The combined FilmStruck / Warner Archive streaming service was discontinued on November 29, 2018, and was replaced by HBO Max.

Collection and operations 
The collection consists of theatrical films, television shows, and television films from the libraries of Warner Bros. Pictures, Turner Entertainment Co. (including pre-May 1986 Metro-Goldwyn-Mayer, Associated Artists Productions, RKO Radio Pictures, Brut Productions, Hanna-Barbera Productions, and pre-1991 Ruby-Spears Enterprises), HBO, Lorimar Productions, Warner Bros. Television, post-August 1946 Allied Artists Pictures, post-1946 Monogram Pictures, Largo Entertainment, New Line Cinema and Castle Rock Entertainment.

Sony Pictures (including Columbia Pictures titles), Paramount Pictures, Metro-Goldwyn-Mayer, Universal Pictures, Walt Disney Studios, and 20th Century Studios have also started MOD services after the success of Warner Archive. Their services are named Sony Pictures Choice Collection (formerly Screen Classics By Request), MGM Limited Edition Collection, Universal Vault Series, Disney Generations Collection, and Fox Cinema Archives, respectively. Including Warner, major film studios and including Lionsgate, CBS, MTV, and Nickelodeon have also started to offer MOD discs of catalog titles through Amazon CreateSpace. On April 13, 2011, Warner Bros. Home Entertainment Group and Sony Pictures Home Entertainment announced that Warner Archive will offer on-demand titles from Sony. MGM Limited Edition titles are also sold through Warner Archive. In 2013, as part of Paramount's agreement with Warner Bros., select Paramount titles were released under the Warner Archive moniker.

Blu-ray 
In November 2012, the Archive collection began releasing titles on Blu-ray, with the first two releases being Deathtrap and Gypsy. Unlike their DVDs all Warner Archive Blu-Rays use pressed discs.

Over the years, Warner Archive's Blu-ray releases expanded to include season sets of current television series, such as iZombie, The 100, Longmire, The Originals, Lucifer, Lethal Weapon, Ballers and Final Space.

Streaming 
Expanding their films' availability to Internet streaming, in July 2014, Warner Archive introduced the Warner Archive Instant service. Similar to Netflix, Warner Archive Instant allows its members access to various Warner Archive library titles via their website, in addition to apps for Roku and iOS-based devices. As of June 2015, the service was presently limited to serving customers who are located in the United States.

In February 2018, Warner Archive retired its online streaming service, transferring several of its films to FilmStruck. It was discontinued as of November 29, 2018, and was replaced by HBO Max in 2020.

Licensors 
 The Criterion Collection
 Mill Creek Entertainment (television series and movies library)
 Shout! Factory (television series and movies library)

References

External links 
 

Home video lines
Warner Bros.
Warner Bros. Discovery brands